| tries = {{#expr:

 + 2 + 1 + 10 + 10 +  4 + 7 + 5 + 1 + 2 + 3 + 4 + 3
 + 2 + 4 +  1 +  3 +  3 + 2 + 4 + 4 + 4 + 2 + 3 + 6
 + 0 + 7 +  4 +  1 +  6 + 3 + 5 + 5 + 7 + 8 + 6 + 5
 + 0 + 2 +  1 +  6 +  9 + 5 + 5 + 1 + 4 + 4 + 3 + 2
 + 5 + 6 +  3 +  6 +  2 + 1 + 2 + 3 + 4 + 5 + 4 + 3
 + 5 + 1 +  2 +  1 + 11 + 1 + 6 + 4 + 2 + 4 + 6 + 7
 + 8 + 2 + 3 + 3
 + 6 + 1
 + 2
}}
| top point scorer = Jonny Wilkinson (Toulon) (100 points)
| top try scorer = Chris Ashton (Saracens) (11 tries)
| venue = Millennium Stadium, Cardiff
| attendance2 = 67,578
| champions =  Toulon
| count = 2
| runner-up =  Saracens
| website = https://web.archive.org/web/20080506141030/http://www.ercrugby.com/eng/
| previous year = 2012–13
| previous tournament = 2012–13 Heineken Cup
| next year = 2014–15
| next tournament = 2014–15 European Rugby Champions Cup
}}
The 2013–14 Heineken Cup was the 19th and final season of the Heineken Cup, the annual rugby union European club competition for clubs from the top six nations in European rugby.

The pool stage began on 11 October 2013 and ran through to 17–19 January 2014, followed by the knockout stages culminating in the final. The final was originally to be held in France in May 2014, however the Federation Française de Rugby subsequently announced that they had withdrawn their application to host due to uncertainty over the availability of Stade de France. ERC invited the Heineken Cup participating countries to submit tenders for the right to host the Heineken Cup and Challenge Cup finals and three – England, Scotland and Wales – submitted bids. Cardiff was selected with the Heineken Cup final to be held in the Millennium Stadium on Saturday 24 May 2014 and the Challenge Cup final to be held the previous day in the Cardiff Arms Park.

Toulon – the defending champions – beat Saracens 23–6 in the final.

On 10 April 2014, following nearly two years of negotiations, an agreement for a new European club competition structure was reached. ERC will be wound up and replaced by a new Swiss-based organising body known as European Professional Club Rugby. The Heineken Cup will be replaced by a new top-tier competition, the European Rugby Champions Cup, It will continue to involve clubs from all of the top six European nations, but will feature 20 clubs instead of the 24 in the Heineken Cup. The second-tier European Challenge Cup will have a minor name change and become the European Rugby Challenge Cup, and will continue to involve 20 teams. A new third-tier competition, to be known as the qualifying Competition, will feature clubs from second-tier European rugby nations, plus Italian clubs that do not play in Pro12.

Teams
The default allocation of teams was as follows:
 England: 6 teams, based on performance in the Aviva Premiership and Anglo–Welsh Cup
 France: 6 teams, based on regular-season finish in the Top 14
 Ireland: 3 teams, based on regular-season finish in Pro12
 Wales: 3 teams, based on regular-season finish in Pro12
 Italy and Scotland: 2 teams each, based on participation in Pro12 (as there are only 2 from each nation)

The remaining two places were filled by the winners of the previous year's Heineken Cup and Amlin Challenge Cup. If the cup winners were already qualified through their domestic league, an additional team from their country would claim a Heineken Cup place (assuming another team was available). Accordingly, since Heineken Cup winners Toulon were already qualified through the Top 14, the extra French berth went to Perpignan. Also, since Amlin Cup winners Leinster were already qualified through the Pro12, the extra Irish berth went to Connacht.

Teams are listed in the order they were presented to Heineken Cup organiser European Rugby Cup by their respective leagues.

Seeding
The seeding system was the same as in the 2012–13 tournament. The 24 competing teams were ranked based on past Heineken Cup and European Challenge Cup performance, with each pool receiving one team from each quartile, or Tier. The requirement to have only one team per country in each pool, however, still applied (with the exception of the inclusion of the seventh French team, Racing Métro 92).

The brackets show each team's European Rugby Club Ranking at the end of the 2012–13 season.

Pool stage

The draw for the pool stage took place on 5 June 2013 at the Aviva Stadium in Dublin. The dates and times of the first 4 rounds were announced on 20 July 2013.

Under the rules of the competition organiser, European Rugby Cup, tie–breakers within each pool were as follows.
 Competition points earned in head-to-head matches
 Total tries scored in head-to-head matches
 Point differential in head-to-head matches

ERC had four additional tie-breakers, used if tied teams are in different pools, or if the above steps cannot break a tie between teams in the same pool:
 Tries scored in all pool matches
 Point differential in all pool matches
 Best disciplinary record (fewest players receiving red or yellow cards in all pool matches)
 Coin toss

Pool 1

Pool 2

Pool 3

Pool 4

Pool 5

Pool 6

Seeding and runners-up
 Bare numbers indicate Heineken Cup quarter–final seeding.
 Numbers with "C" indicate Challenge Cup quarter–final seeding.

Knock-out stages
All kickoff times are local to the match location.

Quarter-finals

Semi-finals

Final

See also
 2013–14 European Challenge Cup

References

External links

2013–14 Heineken Cup at ESPNscrum

 
Heineken Cup seasons
Heineken Cup
Heineken Cup
Heineken
Heineken
Heineken
Heineken
Heineken
Heineken